Albert Hansen (December 13, 1871 – 1943) was an American college football player, coach, and politician. He served as the fourth head football coach at Kansas State Agricultural College, now Kansas State University, holding the position for one season in 1899 and compiling a record of 2–3. Hansen was later elected to the Iowa House of Representatives.

Early life and football career
Hansen was born in Dodge County, Nebraska, in 1871. In 1899, he graduated from the University of Nebraska, where he also lettered for three seasons playing left guard on the football team. After graduation, Hansen was hired as the fourth head football coach at Kansas State University in Manhattan, Kansas. He held that position for the 1899 season, posting a record of 2–3. Hansen also played with the Kansas State team in most of its games.

Political and business career
Hansen left coaching after one season and moved to Harlan, Iowa, where he purchased the Harlan American newspaper. In 1912, Hansen was elected to the Iowa House of Representatives to represent Shelby County, Iowa. He served in the House from 1913 to 1915.

Head coaching record

References

1871 births
1943 deaths
American football guards
Kansas State Wildcats football coaches
Kansas State Wildcats football players
Nebraska Cornhuskers football players
Members of the Iowa House of Representatives
People from Dodge County, Nebraska
People from Harlan, Iowa